Motuma Mekassa (motuma mek’asa; born 30 July 1965) is an Ethiopian politician. He was the Ethiopian Minister of Defense briefly in 2018.

Political career
He is a member of the parliament since 2010 and has been Minister for Ministry of Water, Irrigation and Electric from September 2016 and he was a Minister for mines, Petroleum and Natural Gas until October 2016. He served as Chairman of the National Wash Steering Committee. He was a bureau head of the Oromia Water Resources for 7 years. His first degree is from Addis Ababa University and following his Masters in statistics from Patiala University of India. He joined the government sector as expert in the Oromiya Water bureau. He was a member of the Oromiya Regional Cabinet and is Chairman and Board member for several development Agencies in Ethiopia.

Since the start of his professional career he has accumulated experience in water supply and sanitation projects, hydro projects, large irrigation projects, wind projects, solar projects, energy efficiency projects, rural electrification project, mineral exploration project and sector coordination of emergency preparedness and response assignments in different parts of Oromiya region. He was responsible for the planning, supervision and monitoring of various water supply, sanitation and hygiene (integrated) projects in Oromiya region in a very diverse socio-economic settings: Rural, urban, pastoralist, emergency prone areas and so on. 
In addition to this, he worked as Addis Ababa City government Mayor's office head and cabinet affairs for about 3 years.

He organized and led teams of government experts and planners, community leaders, promoters and technicians in knowledge exchange in development and emergency response areas. He promoted improved knowledge management in areas ranging from planning, management, monitoring & evaluation, gender, community and uniform costing and tariff systems, peri- urban water supply and community organization, municipal and district planning, community participation, water resource management and environment, appropriate technologies, Public-Private Partnerships development, preparation of international agreements.

References

1965 births
Living people
Addis Ababa University alumni
21st-century Ethiopian politicians
Government ministers of Ethiopia
Punjabi University alumni